"Auberge" is a song by British singer-songwriter Chris Rea, which was released in February 1991 as the lead single from his eleventh studio album, Auberge. It was written by Rea and produced by Jon Kelly. "Auberge" reached  16 in the United Kingdom and remained on the UK Singles Chart for six weeks. A music video was filmed to promote the single. It was directed by Nigel Dick and shot at Bray Studios, Berkshire.

Critical reception
Upon release, Music & Media wrote, "Rea at his best: the perfect combination of Dire Straits-framed vocals and Ry Cooder-styled slide guitar. The type of song to play loud during driving. Traffic will be much nicer the next weeks." Andy Stout of Sounds described the song as "good honest rock à la Bob 'Excitement' Harris".

In the US, Billboard described the song as a "dreamy blues-induced rocker", with "dark, Morrison-esque vocal delivery, "rockabilly guitar backdrop", "psychedelic organ vibes" and "lighthearted horn riffs". In a review of the album of the same name, Johnny Loftus of AllMusic wrote, "The rousing title track and its accompanying set piece "Set Me Free" move from searching, tentative guitar noodlings into full-blown epics, with bluesy bottom end, blustering horns, backup singers, and Rea's own grainy vocal rumble."

Track listings
7-inch and cassette single
A. "Auberge"
B. "Hudson's Dream"

12-inch single
A1. "Auberge (In Its Entirety)"
B1. "Hudson's Dream"
B2. "Every Second Counts"

CD single
 "Auberge"
 "Let's Dance" (7-inch version)
 "On the Beach" (7-inch version)
 "The Road to Hell (Part II)"

Personnel
 Chris Rea – guitar, slide guitar, Hammond organ
 Max Middleton – piano
 Robert Ahwai – bass
 Martin Ditcham – drums, percussion
 Carol Kenyon – backing vocals
 Linda Taylor – backing vocals

Production
 Jon Kelly – producer
 Justin Shirley-Smith – engineer
 Russell Shaw – assistant engineer

Other
 Alan Fearnley – illustration

Charts

Weekly charts

Year-end charts

References

1991 songs
1991 singles
Chris Rea songs
East West Records singles
Songs written by Chris Rea